The 2006–07 Liga Super also known as the TM Liga Super for sponsorship reasons is the fourth season of the Liga Super, the top-tier professional football league in Malaysia.

The season was held from 16 December 2006 and concluded on 4 August 2007.

The Liga Super champions for 2006–07 was Kedah.

The FAM has decided to expand the league from eight teams to 14 in total, however, only 13 clubs compete at the start of the season after MPPJ pulled from the league.

The highest scoring game was between Malacca and Perak where Perak defeat Malacca by 9–0.

Perak's Keita Mandjou and DPMM's Mohd Shahrazen Said were joint-top scorer with 21 goals each. Kedah's Marlon Alex James was in third place with 20 goals.

League table 
The final league table after the final matches of the season on 4 August 2007.

Champions

Season statistics

Top scorers

References

Malaysia Super League seasons
1
1
Malaysia